The Arms Act, 1959 is an Act of the Parliament of India to consolidate and amend the law relating to arms and ammunition in order to curb illegal weapons and violence stemming from them. It replaced the Indian Arms Act, 1878.

The Arms Act was passed in 1959.

Chapters
The act is divided into six chapters.
 Chapter I: Preliminary (Section 1 & 2)
Provides a short title and definitions of terms used in the act
 Chapter II: Acquisition, Possession, Manufacture, Sale, Import, Export, and Transport of Arms and Ammunition (Section 3 to 12)
 Explains rules and regulations around acquisition, possession, manufacture, sale, import, export and transport of arms and ammunition in India.
 Chapter III: Provisions relating to licences (Section 13 to 18) 
 Details how to procure license, rules around grant, refusal, fees for license.
 Chapter IV: Powers and Procedure (Section 19 to 24B)
 Provides details on the powers that the government officials have to enforce this act.
 Chapter V: Offences and penalties (Section 25 to 33) 
 Explains punishments associated with breaking rules related to this act.
 Chapter VI: Miscellaneous (Section 34 to 46)
 Deals with the other miscellaneous parts of the act such as exemptions.

Current affairs
The Act has undergone many changes since 1959, the most recent being in 2010 through an amendment for the Arms Act. There was also controversy around air guns to be included as part of this act which was rejected by the Supreme Court of India. Semi-automatic and automatic firearms are illegal to posses by civilians.

Previous legislation
The Indian Arms Act, 1878 was an act regulating the manufacture, sale, possession, and carry of firearms.

Prior to the Indian Rebellion of 1857, there were few gun control laws in Colonial India.

The act included the mandatory licensing to carry a weapon, but contained exclusions for some groups and persons, for instance "all persons of Kodava (Coorg) race".

In a 1918 recruitment leaflet for World War I, Mahatma Gandhi voiced disapproval of the act:“Among the many misdeeds of the British rule in India, history will look upon the Act depriving a whole nation of arms as the blackest. If we want the Arms Act to be repealed, if we want to learn the use of arms, here is a golden opportunity. If the middle classes render voluntary help to Government in the hour of its trial, distrust will disappear, and the ban on possessing arms will be withdrawn.”

In The New Cambridge History of India: Science, Technology and Medicine in Colonial India, historian David Arnold noted the effect of the British rule on weapons, mining and metallurgy in India:

Stun Guns
Under Indian Arms Act, 1956 stun guns and tasers require licensing and are considered as prohibited arms under Section 25 (1A) of the Arms Act.

Edged weapons and bows
Edged weapons like swords, machetes, daggers, spears and ranged weapons like crossbows and bow and arrows require license under the Arms Act. Open carrying of edged weapons and bows is illegal except for Nihang Sikhs after obtaining a license under the Arms Act, and the Gurkha community is allowed to open carry khukris and the Kodava community is allowed to carry swords, bows and even firearms without license but only within the Kodagu district. In 2004 the Ananda Marga sect have been allowed to carry Trishulas (Trident) in their religious processions. Shia Muslims are allowed to carry swords and knives but only during Muharram processions after obtaining permission from the respective local police department.

See also

 Gun law in India
 Anti-terrorism legislation
 Prevention of Terrorism Act, 2002
 Terrorist and Disruptive Activities (Prevention) Act

References

India
Firearm laws
Law of India
Acts of the Parliament of India 1959